Seelye Brook is a stream in the U.S. state of Minnesota.

Seelye Brook was named for Moses Seelye, an early settler.

See also
List of rivers of Minnesota

References

Rivers of Anoka County, Minnesota
Rivers of Isanti County, Minnesota
Rivers of Minnesota